Buxton railway station serves the village of Buxton in Norfolk and is served by the Bure Valley Railway.

Heritage railway stations in Norfolk